Hallodapus is a genus of true bugs belonging to the family Miridae.

The species of this genus are found in Europe, Africa, Japan, Australia.

Species:
 Hallodapus albofasciatus (Motschulsky, 1863)
 Hallodapus basilewskyi (Carvalho, 1951)

References

Miridae